The 1950 Georgetown Hoyas football team was an American football team that represented Georgetown University as an independent during the 1950 college football season. In their second season under head coach Bob Margarita, the Hoyas compiled a 2–7 record and were outscored by a total of 187 to 116. The team played its home games at Griffith Stadium in Washington, D.C.

Schedule

References

Georgetown
Georgetown Hoyas football seasons
Georgetown Hoyas football